Jean Jouzel, (born 5 March 1947) is a prominent French glaciologist and climatologist. He has mainly worked on the reconstruction of past climate derived from the study of the Antarctic and Greenland ice.

Career
Jean Jouzel's career occurred mostly in CEA (Commissariat à l'Energie Atomique) which is the French nuclear public organization. In 1991 he became vice president of LMCE which is the CEA laboratory dedicated to environment and climate ; in 1995 he became its research director. In 1998 he became director of climate research of LSCE which resulted from the fusion of LMCE with another environmental research laboratory. From 2001 to 2008 he was director of IPSL (Institut Pierre Simon Laplace) which is a major federative laboratory on climate research in Paris region, including CEA LMCE-LSCE. 

He has focused his research on isotopic modelling, especially water isotopes for reconstruction of past climate, from ice cores. Since the 1970s, he has joined his effort with the prominent French glaciologist Claude Lorius and he has contributed to the project of deep ice drilling in Antarctica, first in Vostok, then in EPICA (European Project for Ice Coring in Antarctica) which he will lead from 1995 to 2001, producing 800,000 years of climate history.

Involvement in IPCC
From 2002 to 2015 Jean Jouzel was vice-chair of the Scientific Working Group of the Intergovernmental Panel on Climate Change (IPCC).

Political activism
Jean Jouzel has supported socialist candidates, including Benoit Hammon for the French Republic presidential elections occurred in 2017 and Anne Hidalgo, for whom he has agreed to be chair of the support committee for the Paris mayoral elections of 2020.

Awards
Jean Jouzel has received many scientific or public awards.

In 1997 he received the Milutin Milankovic Medal. 

In 2002 he received with Claude Lorius the CNRS gold medal, the highest French scientific award.

In 2003, he received the Roger Revelle Medal

In 2012 he received the Vetlesen Prize, shared with Susan Solomon.

In 2015, he received the Leonardo da Vinci Award from European Academy of Sciences.

In 2016 he was elected as a foreign associate of the US National Academy of Sciences.

In 2017 he was elected as a member of the French Academy of Science.

Bibliography

References

External links
 Biography in French or English

1947 births
Living people
Scientists from Brittany
French climatologists
Foreign associates of the National Academy of Sciences
French glaciologists